Lincoln Porteous Cole, Jr. (September 18, 1918 – July 28, 1999) was an American politician.

Born in Fall River, Massachusetts, he went to Northbridge High School and Northeastern University School of Law. Cole served as Lexington town selectman and moderator. He served in the Massachusetts House of Representatives representing Lexington from 1965 until 1980 as a Republican.

See also
 Massachusetts House of Representatives' 15th Middlesex district

Notes

1918 births
1999 deaths
Politicians from Fall River, Massachusetts
Northeastern University School of Law alumni
Republican Party members of the Massachusetts House of Representatives
20th-century American politicians